David Bergeron (born December 4, 1981) is an NFL linebacker who played with the Carolina Panthers.

Education
David Bergeron attended Lakeridge High School, after graduating high school he went to college at Stanford University. He finished his career there with two sacks, 176 tackles (16.5 for losses), two forced fumbles, a fumble recovery, an interception, three pass deflections, and a blocked kick.

NFL career
Drafted in 2005, Bergeron was taken by the Philadelphia Eagles in the 7th round (38th pick). After that, David Bergeron was a linebacker on the Carolina Panthers. Bergeron is no longer in the NFL.

NFL combine results
40-yard dash:  4.72 seconds
20-yard shuttle:  4.23 seconds 
Benchpress:  325 pounds
Squat:  510 pounds
Powerclean:  275 pounds
Vertical jump:  34 inches

References

American football linebackers
Carolina Panthers players
Stanford Cardinal football players
Cologne Centurions (NFL Europe) players
Sportspeople from Lake Oswego, Oregon
Players of American football from Oregon
1981 births
Living people
Lakeridge High School alumni